Nahed Taher (Arabic:ناهد طاهر) is Saudi businesswoman, founder and chief executive officer of Gulf One Investment Bank, which has its headquarters in Bahrain.

Education

Taher went to school in Austin, Texas, as her father was completing his studies. Then she studied in Kuwait, when her father was elected the President of OPEC, later she continued her secondary education in Saudi Arabia, and joined the King Abdulaziz University in Jeddah, where she earned her Master's degree in Economics. Taher continued her studies at Lancaster University Management School in the UK, where she received her MSc in Economics in 1998, and PhD in Economics in 2001.

Career

After returning to Saudi Arabia, Taher worked as senior economist for the National Commercial Bank. In 2005 she was made CEO of Gulf One Investment Bank, becoming the first woman to lead a bank in the Persian Gulf area. Taher left the position in 2017 to join the National Standard Finance as president.

Recognition

In 2006 Taher was ranked 72nd in  Forbes'  100 Most Powerful Women in the World. In 2010 she was listed in the  Financial Times'  Women at the Top for the most prominent businesswomen around the world.

References

Saudi Arabian chief executives
Saudi Arabian women
Alumni of Lancaster University
Alumni of Graduate College, Lancaster
Year of birth missing (living people)
Living people
King Abdulaziz University alumni
Saudi Arabian women in business